Ilorin East is a Local Government Area in Kwara State, Nigeria. Its headquarters are in the town of Oke Oyi.
 
It has an area of 486 km and a population of 204,310 at the 2006 census.
 
The postal code of the area is 240.

References

Local Government Areas in Kwara State